Ilie Gârneață (1898 – 28 May 1971) was a lawyer and founding member of the Legionary Movement, a far-right movement in Romania.

Biography 
Gârneață was born in Iași, Kingdom of Romania, in 1898. He served as a volunteer in the World War I. First attending a military school in Botoșani, he later studied law in Iași. In 1922, Corneliu Zelea Codreanu appointed him president of the local chapter of the Association of Christian Students. Gârneață's family lived in Darabani, in Western Moldavia.

In October 1923, Gârneaţă and five others (including Corneliu Zelea Codreanu, Ion Moța, Radu Mironovici, Teodosie Popescu, and Corneliu Georgescu) were arrested in Bucharest under suspicion of attempting to spark a civil war in Romania. The group, who became known as the Văcăreșteni (named after the prison at Văcărești, where they were held), were accused of amassing arms and plotting to kill government ministers and Jewish business figures.

In 1924, he was imprisoned alongside Codreanu and 11 others for the killing of Romanian Police prefect Constantin Manciu.

Legionary Movement 
Gârneață was one of the founding members of the Legionary Movement (later known as the Iron Guard), and from 1936 onwards held the title of Comandant al Bunei Vestiri ("Commandant of the Annunciation"), the highest rank in the organization.

Gârneață was a frequent contributor to Pământul strămoșesc, an organ of the Legionary Movement which began publication in 1927. In 1931 he began to co-edit the antisemitic newspaper Cuvântul Iașului alongside Nelu Ionescu and Stelian Teodorescu.

After the Legionary Movement came to power in September 1940, forming the National Legionary State alongside Ion Antonescu, Gârneață was one of only two "Commandants of the Annunciation" (the other being Radu Mironovici) who did not hold office. However, he proposed and led Ajutorul Legionar ("Legionary Aid"), a network of canteens and mutual aid centres throughout Romania aimed at serving refugees from recently-ceded territories of Bessarabia, Bukovina, and Transylvania, and one of the higher-profile outlets of Legionary propaganda.

Exile and death 
Following the Legionnaire's Rebellion and subsequent crackdown on the Legionary Movement by Ion Antonescu, Gârneață fled with other Legionary leaders to Germany. He was initially put under surveillance alongside Horia Sima and other high-profile Legionnaires in a villa in Berkenbrück, near Berlin.

He died in Erding, West Germany on 28 May 1971 at the age of 73.

References 

1898 births
1971 deaths
Members of the Iron Guard
Politicians from Iași
20th-century Romanian lawyers
Alexandru Ioan Cuza University alumni
Romanian anti-communists